Thor manningi is a species of crustacean. The common name for this species is the Manning grass shrimp. On average the life span in this species is 4 to 5 months. The species uses drag powered swimming to move from place to place.

Thor manningi is a trioecious species with males, females and protandrous hermaphrodites. Individuals approaching sex change have a mixture of male and female characteristics. In this species 50% of the population are males, 49% protandric hermaphrodites, and 1% are females.

References 

Alpheoidea